The Minister of State for Disabled People, Health and Work is a mid-level minister in the Department for Work and Pensions of the United Kingdom government, with responsibility for disabled people. The position is currently held by Tom Pursglove.

Current Portfolio
The minister's responsibilities include the following:
 Cross-government disability issues
 Work and health strategy, including sponsorship of the Joint Work and Health Unit
 Disability employment, including Disability Confident, Work Choice, Access to Work, the Work and Health Programme and mental health in the workplace
 Support for those at risk of falling out of work, including occupational health and Statutory Sick Pay
 Financial support for sick and disabled claimants, including within:
 Universal Credit
 Disability Living Allowance
 Personal Independence Payment
 Employment and Support Allowance
 Attendance Allowance
 Industrial Injuries Disablement Benefit
 Carer’s Allowance
 Specific welfare and health-related issues, including Motability and arms-length compensation schemes
 Oversight of the Health and Safety Executive and the Office for Nuclear Regulation

List of ministers
11 March 1974 Alf Morris Parliamentary Under-Secretary (DHSS) (Disablement)
7 May 1979 Reg Prentice Minister of State (DHSS) (Social Security)
5 January 1981 Hugh Rossi Minister of State (DHSS) (Social Security)
13 June 1983 Rhodes Boyson Minister of State (DHSS) (Social Security)
11 September 1984 Tony Newton Minister of State (DHSS) (Social Security and Disabled)
 Minister of State (Department of Social Security) — 20 July 19945 July 1995
 Minister (Department of Social Security) (Disabled) — 6 July 19952 May 1997
 Parliamentary Under-Secretary (Department of Health) — 6 May 199728 October 1998
 Parliamentary Under-Secretary (Department for Education and Employment) (Employment and Equal Opportunities) — 28 July 199810 June 2001

With a tenure of four years and six days, Eagle was the longest-serving Parliamentary Secretary; with a tenure of two year and six months, Tomlinson is the longest-serving Minister of State so far.

See also 
 Department of Health and Social Security 11 March 1974 to 25 July 1988
 Department of Social Security 25 July 1988 to
 Department for Work and Pensions 8 June 2001 to present

References

Disabled
Department for Work and Pensions